Bram Zwanen (born 23 March 1998) is a Dutch football player. He plays for De Treffers.

Club career
He made his Eerste Divisie debut for Helmond Sport on 15 September 2017 in a game against Jong Ajax.

On 28 February 2021, he agreed to join De Treffers for the 2021–22 season.

References

External links
 

1998 births
People from Laarbeek
Living people
Dutch footballers
Association football midfielders
Helmond Sport players
De Treffers players
Eerste Divisie players
Tweede Divisie players
Derde Divisie players
Footballers from North Brabant